No. 9 Park is a restaurant in the Beacon Hill neighborhood of downtown Boston, Massachusetts, United States. It opened in 1998.

They won the 2012 James Beard Award for the best wine program.

References

External links

Buildings and structures in Boston
Restaurants in Boston
Restaurants established in 1998
1998 establishments in Massachusetts
James Beard Foundation Award winners
Beacon Hill, Boston